Oxide & Neutrino are an English DJ and MC garage duo from London, consisting of Alex Rivers (Oxide), and Mark Osei-tutu (Neutrino).

Musical career
Their first single "Bound 4 da Reload (Casualty)" entered at the top of the UK Singles Chart in April 2000. It is known for sampling the theme music to the BBC medical drama series Casualty, ITV police drama The Bill and also contains samples of dialogue from the 1998 film Lock, Stock and Two Smoking Barrels.

Their track "Shoot to Kill" appears, played from car stereos, in the film Ali G Indahouse. It is also featured on the original soundtrack CD.

Oxide & Neutrino are members of UK garage group So Solid Crew. Oxide also produced tracks on Lisa Maffia's debut album, First Lady, and the track "Industry Lady" on Face's mixtape Sign 2 the Block.

The duo made a return to the music scene in 2007, first with new single "What R U" released on 14 May, and then with their fourth album 2nd Chance following on 11 June. An interview with Darker Romello of Mayhem TV entitled "The Return of Oxide & Neutrino" appeared on Grimedaily, announcing new material set to be released in the summer of 2011.

In 2013, the duo appeared alongside many other garage pioneers in a documentary exploring the legacy of UK garage, Rewind 4Ever: The History of UK Garage.

The duo signed a new record deal in January 2021 with New State Music and released the track "Where Do We Go" featuring Leo the Lion.

Discography

Studio albums

Multi-artist compilation albums

EPs

Singles

References

External links
 Oxide & Neutrino official site

So Solid Crew members
English hip hop groups
English electronic music duos
Male musical duos
Musical groups established in 1999
UK garage duos
Hip hop duos
Musical groups from London
1999 establishments in England
East West Records artists